Hofkirchen bei Hartberg is a former municipality in the district of Hartberg-Fürstenfeld in Styria, Austria. Since the Styria municipal structural reform of 2015, it is part of the municipality of Kaindorf.

References

Cities and towns in Hartberg-Fürstenfeld District